Harry Reynolds (born Balbriggan, Ireland, 14 December 1874, died 16 July 1940), known as the Balbriggan Flyer, was the first Irishman to win the world championship in cycling.  He accomplished this at the 1896 ICA Track Cycling World Championships in Copenhagen.

In 2005 Harry Reynolds Road in his hometown of Balbriggan was named after him.

References

Irish male cyclists
Irish track cyclists
UCI Track Cycling World Champions (men)
People from Balbriggan
Sportspeople from Fingal
1874 births
1940 deaths